Scott Neilson (born 31 January 1957) is a Canadian former track and field athlete who competed in the hammer throw.

His greatest achievement was a gold medal at the 1979 Pan American Games. He was also a silver medallist at the Commonwealth Games in 1978 and was a seven-time NCAA champion while at the University of Washington.

Career
He attended the University of Washington and competed for their Washington Huskies collegiate team. He also won three straight weight throw titles at the NCAA Indoor Championships in the same period. This made him the most successful athlete ever in the NCAA events. He also won four Pacific Coast Conference titles in hammer.

His first international medal came at the age of eighteen at the 1975 Pan American Games. He was the first Canadian to win a hammer throw medal at that competition. Three years later at the 1978 Commonwealth Games, held in Edmonton, Alberta, Canada, he became the first Canadian hammer medallist since George Sutherlandin 1934 by taking a silver medal behind Australia's Peter Farmer. Only shot putter Bruce Pirnie had won a Pan American gold among Canadian throwers.

The last major result of his international career came at the age of twenty three at the Liberty Bell Classic, organised due to the 1980 Summer Olympics boycott that year. He defeated American Boris Djerassi at the alternative event with a mark of  – one of the best of his career. Neilson also competed at the IAAF World Cup event, representing North America, and came fifth in 1977 and fourth in 1981.

International competitions

National titles
USA Outdoor Track and Field Championships
Hammer throw: 1979
Canadian Track and Field Championships
Hammer throw: 1976, 1978, 1979, 1980
NCAA Men's Division I Outdoor Track and Field Championships
Hammer throw: 1976, 1977, 1978, 1979
NCAA Men's Division I Indoor Track and Field Championships
Weight throw: 1977, 1978, 1979

References

External links

Living people
1957 births
Canadian male hammer throwers
Male weight throwers
Pan American Games gold medalists for Canada
Pan American Games bronze medalists for Canada
Pan American Games medalists in athletics (track and field)
Athletes (track and field) at the 1979 Pan American Games
Athletes (track and field) at the 1975 Pan American Games
Commonwealth Games medallists in athletics
Athletes (track and field) at the 1978 Commonwealth Games
Washington Huskies men's track and field athletes
Commonwealth Games silver medallists for Canada
Medalists at the 1975 Pan American Games
Medalists at the 1979 Pan American Games
Medallists at the 1978 Commonwealth Games